An infection is the detrimental colonization of a host organism by a foreign species.

Infection, infected, or infectious may also refer to:

Film and television

Film
 Infected (2008 film), a Canadian TV science fiction horror film
 Infected (2012 film), an American science fiction horror film
 Infected (2013 American film) or Quarantine L.A., an action horror film
 Infected (2013 British film) or The Dead Inside, a horror film

 Infection (2003 film), a Croatian film
 Infection (2004 film), a Japanese horror film
 Infection (2019 film), a Venezuelan film

Television
 "Infected" (The Last of Us), a 2023 episode
 "Infected" (Law & Order: Special Victims Unit), a 2006 episode
 "Infected" (The Practice), a 1999 episode
 "Infected" (The Walking Dead), a 2013 episode

 "Infection" (Babylon 5), a 1994 episode
 "Infection" (Chicago franchise), a 2019 crossover event
 "Infection" (Stargate Atlantis), a 2008 episode

Music
 Infected (band), an Australian metal band
 The Infected, an American punk band
 Infectious Music, a British record label

Albums
 Infected (The The album) or the title song, 1986
 Infected (HammerFall album), 2011
 The Infection, by Chimaira, 2009
 Infectious, by Suburban Legends, 2007

Songs
 "Infected" (song), by Bad Religion, 1994
 "Infected", by Baboon from Ed Lobster, 1991
 "Infected", by Barthezz, 2001
 "Infected", by Demon Hunter from Demon Hunter, 2002
 "Infected", from the film Repo! The Genetic Opera, 2008
 "Infection", by Beartooth from Disease, 2018
 "Infection", by Lacuna Coil from Broken Crown Halo, 2014
 "Infection", by Rx Bandits from Progress, 2001
 "The Infection", by Disturbed from Asylum, 2010

Video games
 Infected (video game), a 2005 PlayStation Portable game
 Infected, a game mode in Call of Duty: Modern Warfare 3
 Infection (video game) or Ataxx, a 1990 video board game

Other uses
 Affection (linguistics), or infection, a type of vowel change in Celtic languages
 Infected (novel), a 2008 novel by Scott Sigler
 Infection (journal), a medical journal

See also
 
 Affection (disambiguation)